The Rishi Valley geckoella (Cyrtodactylus rishivalleyensis) is a species of nocturnal, terrestrial, insectivorous gecko that is endemic to India. This recently described species is named after the Rishi Valley School, and this is currently known from hills of the Eastern Ghats, in Chittoor district of Andhra Pradesh state.

References 

Cyrtodactylus
Reptiles described in 2016